NRK Super is a Norwegian TV & radio channel aimed at children, run by the Norwegian Broadcasting Corporation. The TV channel is broadcast on the digital terrestrial network, on the same frequency as NRK3 from 7am to 7pm, and was launched 1 December 2007. The NRK Super radio channel is broadcast on DAB radio (from 6am to 9pm) and the internet, and was originally named NRK Barn (NRK Children in English). It was launched on 16 October 2007.

NRK Super also has a web community where children can sign up and play games that allow them to get their own profile and get friends online.
Here also small children can visit the homepages of shows they have seen on TV, such like Fantorangen, Tøfferud (Chuggington), Komet Kameratene, and others. On some important days, NRK Super also broadcasts dramas and children's films.

Viasat and RiksTV broadcasts this channel as number 6. NRK Super starts from 7am and ends 7:30pm.

History

NRK Super was started on 1 December 2007, after NRK received the same year's funding of the 50-60 million kroner the channel was estimated to cost, via an increased license. With NRK Super, NRK wanted to fulfill its public broadcasting obligations towards Norwegian children in the target group 2–12, by giving them a holistic offer rooted in Norwegian reality. The vision "We shall create a world where children grow and are important" became a guideline for the channel early on. With the launch of several children's channels in Norway, Disney had achieved high popularity in a few years. NRK Super was the media house NRK's counter move to face the competition from Disney and other commercial channels.

When the channel started, some of the children's programs were broadcast in parallel on the TV channels NRK1 and NRK Super. With the development of the digital terrestrial network, the transmission frequency of NRK Super and NRK3 became available to all license payers. From and including 2010, the children's programs are broadcast, with some exceptions, exclusively on NRK Super. The traditional flagship for children's programs in Norway, Barne-TV, was removed from NRK1's broadcast schedule as of 1 January 2010 and is now only broadcast on NRK Super, having been a regular feature on NRK1 since 16 September 1960.

On 4 January 2010, NRK Super started the program Supernytt, Norway's first news program for children. As of January 2018, the program is broadcast weekdays at 18:50.

NRK Super has had a significant increase in support since its launch. After the first half of 2015, the TV channel had a 36% market share among children under the age of 12. An increasingly large proportion of the content that has traditionally been consumed on TV is now consumed on other platforms. The TV channel accounted for February 2015 about 65% of the audience's use of NRK Super's content, while NRK Super's web/NetTV/apps accounted for 35% of audience visits.

Programs
The programming shown on NRK Super's television network is greatly varied. In the mornings, programming aired at preschoolers is aired. Often, these series are animated series imported from foreign countries, all dubbed into Norwegian. Some of these programs, as listed on their website, include PAW Patrol, Ricky Zoom, Fireman Sam, Esme & Roy, Peppa Pig and Hey Duggee.

NRK Super airs programs for older children later in the day, including a mix of live-action Norwegian originals and foreign animated and live-action series alike dubbed into Norwegian. Their repertoire of dubbed series includes It's Pony, I, Elvis Riboldi, and SpongeBob SquarePants, as per their website.

Vision
In 2014, NRK Super summarized its vision as follows:
"NRK Super wants to contribute to children living in Norway having a safe and good media childhood. We must be a universe that reflects cultural diversity and that strengthens the children's identity and self-esteem. Our most important task is to convey good stories and content that is rooted in Norwegian language and culture."

In 2014, the channel had further set itself the goal that it should "play on a team with the school and society" and "respect children as they are (human beings)".

Logos and identities

2007-present

Platforms
NRK Super is a collective term for NRK's content for children aged 2 to 12. As of 6 August 2015, these are the main platforms NRK Super broadcasts on:

TV
NRK Super's TV channel started broadcasting on 1 December 2007, and broadcasts from 06:30 to 19:30 every day. The channel shares slot with NRK3. The channel is by far the most watched TV channel among Norwegian children. The broadcast schedule consists of in-house productions within drama, documentary and formatted programmes, content produced for NRK by external producers, as well as purchased Norwegian and foreign productions. NRK Super makes around 25% of the programs broadcast on the channel itself. With few exceptions, programs where Norwegian is not the original language are dubbed into Norwegian.

Radio
The DAB channel Radio Super was started in autumn 2007 under the name NRK Barn. The channel broadcasts from 06:00 to 21:00, and 24/7 on the internet. The program "Skolefri" broadcasts as of January 2018 live, weekdays between 14:00 and 16:00 online and DAB.

Website
The website nrksuper.no was launched in the autumn of 2007, and appeared at the launch as a kind of portal with a section for small children and a section for older children. The design has since been changed several times. The content includes games, online TV and online drama. As of 6 August 2015, the website is Norway's largest website for children.

App
NRK Super launched its own NRK Super app for mobile and tablet in connection with the 2012 school holidays. With the NRK Super app, the user can watch TV programs, live or reruns. In 2015, there were approximately 340,000 unique users per week of NRK Super's online TV offer; NRK Super app and NRK Super's online video platform included. On April 7, 2015, Super presented a new version of the app, which at this time generated over 1 million visits a week.

FlippKlipp YouTube channel
FlippKlipp was first led by Preben Fjell and Dennis Vareide, who became known as the duo Prebz and Dennis. Then Jonas Lihaug Fredriksen and Henrik Hildre took over, as the duo Baibai and Huginn. Eventually, the duo Fredriksen and Hildre was expanded into a trio, with Victor Sotberg as the third presenter. Herman Dahl was the presenter in a few broadcasts; so was Robin Hofset, known as the YouTuber "RobTheSir". Later, Christopher Robin Omdahl became a presenter on the channel.

References

External links
NRK Super
NRK3/NRK Super Live TV on internet
NRK Radio Super Live radio on internet

NRK
Television channels in Norway
Radio stations in Norway
Television channels and stations established in 2007
Radio stations established in 2007
2007 establishments in Norway

Hundeparken